Louro José was a parrot puppet (parrots are popularly called louro in Brazil) played by former stage manager Neilton Veiga Júnior, better known as Tom Veiga (1973–2020). Louro had participated, along with TV presenter Ana Maria Braga, on Mais Você, a show which airs from Monday through Friday on TV Globo.

The parrot was more than simply a supporting character: he served as the comic relief of the program by using his witty humor and telling jokes every now and then to lighten the mood, and even purposefully disagreeing with Ana Maria Braga, the hostess, to provoke her. His voice was shrill, mimicking a real parrot.

History

Rede Record 
Neilton Veiga Júnior, better known as Tom Veiga, was a studio manager and executive producer of the program "" at Rede Record, which was presented by Ana Maria Braga. Before working on the show, he worked as a courier and as an ambulance driver, as well as helping organize events. Veiga met Ana Maria Braga around 1995. He organized artisan craft fairs that Ana Maria Braga would publicize in her show, "Note e Anote". After being invited to join the team, Veiga became a stage assistant. 

In March 1997, while Ana Maria Braga was stuck in traffic with her then husband, Carlos Madrulha, she told him she "needed a puppet to make a smoother transition", given that Note e Anote aired right after a children's show. She and Madrulha discussed possibilities and eventually settled on a parrot, as it is one of the few animals that can talk. The choice for the name was inspired by a real parrot owned by Ana Maria Braga, also called "Louro José". The name is a tribute to her father, Natale Giuseppe "José" Maffeis. On March 6, Louro José starred on national television. Many people were tried for the role of puppeteer, but no one seemed to fit the part well. Seeing a then 23-year-old Tom Veiga playing with the puppet, Ana Maria Braga temporarily put him in the role. In the first months, Veiga worked as both a stage assistant and puppeteer. When he was made effective as the parrot, he celebrated, saying: "my life has changed completely".

Legal issues 
In September 1997, about 6 months after the creation of the puppet, Rede Record attempted to trademark the "Louro José" brand. However, predicting the puppet's success, Ana Maria Braga had already registered the brand.

The company hired to make the puppet, Display Set, as well as Disney, both also attempted to trademark the Louro José brand – with Disney claiming the puppet was plagiarism, a copy of José Carioca. Like Rede Record, they were both unsuccessful and Ana Maria Braga's trademark was upheld.

TV Globo 
In 1999, Ana Maria and Louro José were hired by Globo, becoming a part of the Cem Modos team, the same from the TV Colosso show.

In May 2012, Veiga renewed his contract with Globo for another 4 years, laying to rest rumors that Louro José would stop participating on Mais Você.

According to Outro Canal, in 2015 Veiga was promoted to assistant director.

On November 1, 2020, at the age of 47, Veiga was found dead in his home in Rio de Janeiro.

Character biography 
A 2000 episode of Mais Você aired with a video clip retconning Louro José's "birth". In it, Ana Maria Braga is shown breaking open a giant egg with a hammer, to the sound of a baby crying in the background. From inside the egg comes out Louro José, yelling "Mommy!".

Louro José roots for São Paulo's football team Corinthians.

Friends and family of Louro José have also made appearances on the program.  For instance, Andorinha Dorinha, Louro José's girlfriend, is a blue swallow ("andorinha", in Portuguese) and Sovena Group's Azeite Andorinha's ("Swallow Olive Oil") mascot. She lives in an olive grove located in Ferreira do Alentejo, Portugal. She was introduced on March 30, 2011, on an episode of Mais Você.  Loura Maria, Louro José's cousin, is said to be from New York City. She is a pink parrot who wears wigs and makeup, and was created following a suggestion by Fernanda Young.

Following Veiga's passing, a substitute parrot mascot, provisionally nicknamed "Lourinho", was introduced on 5 April 2022, played by Fabio Caniatto. A few days later, a second parrot mascot appeared alongside Lourinho, called "Louro Mano". While both claimed to be the true heir to Louro José's throne, a DNA test was conducted, and Lourinho was confirmed to be the son of Louro José. Aditionally, while public voting decided on the official name "Lourito", Ana Maria Braga decided to nickname the mascot "Louro Mané".

In other media 
Louro José was such a popular character that he had many appearances throughout the years, in other shows from Rede Globo:

Merchandise 
A lot of Louro José merchandise has been released over the years, including toys, mugs, joke books, comic books, phone cases, various flavors of chewing gum and even bird food. A talking replica of Louro José was released in 2008 as a kid's toy.

Notes

References

External links 

 Official website (archived from the original on January 11, 2007)
 Unforgettable Characters: Louro José

Fictional parrots
Comedy television characters
Television characters introduced in 1997
Puppets
Fictional Brazilian people
Brazilian comics titles
Television shows adapted into comics